Company Glacier is in Wenatchee National Forest in the U.S. state of Washington, on the north slopes of Bonanza Peak, the tallest non-volcanic peak in the Cascade Range. Company Glacier was used as the approach route when Bonanza Peak was first climbed in 1937.

See also
List of glaciers in the United States

References

Glaciers of the North Cascades
Glaciers of Chelan County, Washington
Glaciers of Washington (state)